This was the first edition of the tournament, Johan Brunström and Frederik Nielsen won the title defeating Carsten Ball and Dustin Brown in the final 6–3, 5–7, [10–5].

Seeds

Draw

References
 Main Draw

Fairfield Challenger - Doubles
Fairfield Challenger